The 1991 NCAA Division I Women's Tennis Championships were the 10th annual championships to determine the national champions of NCAA Division I women's singles, doubles, and team collegiate tennis in the United States. They were hosted by Stanford University at the Stanford Tennis Stadium in Stanford, California between May 11–15, 1991. 

Stanford defeated UCLA, 5–1, in the championship match to win their eighth overall and sixth consecutive team title.

See also
1991 NCAA Division I Men's Tennis Championships – the men's and women's tournaments would not be held at the same site until 2006.
NCAA Division II Tennis Championships (Men, Women)
NCAA Division III Tennis Championships (Men, Women)

References

External links
List of NCAA Women's Tennis Champions

NCAA Division I tennis championships
NCAA Division I Women's Tennis Championships
NCAA Division I Women's Tennis Championships
NCAA Division I Women's Tennis Championships
Tennis in California